Brit Awards 2007  was the 27th edition of the Brit Awards, an annual pop music awards ceremony in the United Kingdom. It was organised by the British Phonographic Industry and took place on 14 February 2007 at Earls Court in London. The show, when broadcast, attracted 5.43 million viewers.
The ceremony was hosted by Russell Brand, with Fearne Cotton interviewing winners backstage, and the voiceover by Tom Baker. The show was supposedly being broadcast live for the first time since 1989, on ITV1; however, it was revealed to have been on a 30-second tape delay. The sound occasionally dropped out, apparently in an attempt to censor strong language ("fuck" was always censored), although swearing by Liam Gallagher, Simon Pegg, Mark Owen and host Brand was nonetheless audible on the broadcast.
The pre-show was called The BRITs Red Carpet, and was hosted by Lauren Laverne, Matt Willis, Alesha Dixon and Russell Howard. The show that followed was called The BRITs Encore.

Performances

Winners and nominees

Outstanding Contribution to Music
Oasis (presented by Russell Brand)

Multiple nominations and awards

Moments

Russell Brand
Some controversy was caused by the host of the 2007 ceremony, comedian Russell Brand, who made several quips relating to news stories of the time including singer Robbie Williams' entering rehabilitation for addiction to prescription drugs, the Queen's 'naughty bits' and a fatal friendly fire incident involving a British soldier killed by American armed forces in Iraq. ITV1 received over 300 complaint calls from viewers. He would again instigate controversy the following year at the 2008 MTV Video Music Awards.

References

External links
Brit Awards 2007 at Brits.co.uk

Brit Awards
Brit Awards
Brit Awards
Brit Awards
Brit
Brit Awards